Ginger & the Sonic Circus is a collective of friends and musicians led by the Wildhearts' frontman Ginger (David Walls).

Ginger formed the band following the 2005 split of the Wildhearts with guitarist/ producer Jason Edwards (Wolfsbane) and Jon Poole (the Wildhearts/ Cardiacs), they were soon joined by Conny Bloom (Hanoi Rocks) and Vickie (Vix) Perks (We've Got a Fuzzbox and We're Gonna Use It). The project was initially intended to be a one off, but all involved felt that it should be explored further following their first successful performance. They went on to headline the Gibson stage at the 2006 Download festival and did several dates in the United States and Japan as well as a couple of United Kingdom tours before 'the Wildhearts' eventually reformed, putting plans on hold.

Releases
Ginger & the Sonic Circus have not released any material, as they were originally formed to play music from Ginger's first solo album Valor Del Corazon.
Ginger has said that he is planning a Ginger & the Sonic Circus album, but release dates are unknown.

Members 
 Ginger - vocals/ guitars
 Jason Edwards - guitar/ backing vocals
 'Random' Jon Poole - bass/ backing vocals
 Conny Bloom - guitar/backing vocals
 Vix Perks - backing vocals
 Tanisjah - backing vocals
 Luis Soeiro - keyboards
 Ralph Bossingham - saxophone/tenor saxophone
 Dean Pearson (Denzel) - drums

British rock music groups